Congregational-Presbyterian Church (also known as the Presbyterian Church) is a historic church building near Ohio State Route 5 and Ohio State Route 5 in Kinsman, Ohio, United States. It is one of the oldest church buildings in Trumbull County.

The Greek Revival church building was constructed in 1831. The building was added to the National Register of Historic Places in 1971.

References

Presbyterian churches in Ohio
Churches on the National Register of Historic Places in Ohio
Greek Revival church buildings in Ohio
Carpenter Gothic church buildings in Ohio
Churches completed in 1831
Buildings and structures in Trumbull County, Ohio
National Register of Historic Places in Trumbull County, Ohio